Balotra is a district in of Rajasthan state in India.

Geography
It has an average elevation of 106 metres (347 feet).

Demographics
 India census, Balotra city has population of 74496 of which 38715 are males and 35781 are females. The population of children between age 0-6 is 10984 which is 14.74% of total population.

The sex-ratio of Balotra city is around 924 compared to 928 which is average of Rajasthan state. The literacy rate of Balotra city is 64.39% out of which 73.26% males are literate and 54.78% females are literate. There are 14.2% Scheduled Caste (SC) and 3.37% Scheduled Tribe (ST) of total population in Balotra city.

Means of transport
Balotra railways stations

The station code is BLT. 
Time Table as per 23/03/2022 
Plz Verify with Indian Railways Official Train Enquiry Site 

Earlier a metre gauge  line was passed through Balotra that was converted to broad gauge. Balotra is well connected to other cities like Jodhpur, Jaipur and New Delhi.

The station code is BLT. Earlier a metre gauge line passed through Balotra that was converted to broad gauge. Balotra is  connected to other cities like Jodhpur, Jaipur and Chandigarh.

Bus service

Balotra has both private and RSTRC Bus services for various cities of India like Jodhpur, Pali, Barmar, Jalore, Kota, Bikaner, Jaipur, Udaipur, Ahmadabad, Pune, Mumbai, Surat, Vadodara etc. The bus for Jodhpur and Barmar is in every 30 minutes.

 The bus for Jalore is in every 30 minutes . The bus for Pali is in every 60 minutes. The bus for cities Jaipur, Ahmedabad, Pune, Surat, etc. is in both morning and nights.

The nearest airport from Balotra is Jodhpur airport, 100 km away from Balotra.

References

Cities and towns in Barmer district